KFF Liria is a women's football club based in Prizren, Kosovo. The club competes in Kosovo Women's Football League which is the top tier of women's football in the country, since the 2017/18 season. Their home ground is the Përparim Thaçi Stadium which has a seating capacity of 10,000.

See also
 List of football clubs in Kosovo

References

Football clubs in Kosovo
Women's football clubs in Kosovo